Igual que ayer is the sixth album of Enanitos Verdes published in 1992. The group signed a contract with the label EMI. The production of the disc was again headed by Andres Calamaro, also with the participation of Alejandro Lerner, León Gieco, and Manuel Wirtz. It quickly attained
Gold Record

Track listing 

 Igual Que Ayer [Same as yesterday] - 4:48
 Blancoazul [Whiteblue] - 3:58
 No Llores Por Su Amor [Don't cry for his love - 4:37 
 Fiesta Sin Invitación [Party without invitation] - 4:17
 El Temor [The fear] - 4:16
 Amigos [Friends] - 2:56
 Era Un Ángel [She was an angel] - 3:34
 La Luz de Tu Mirar [The light of your look] - 5:00
 Jurarás [You swear] - 4:07
 Polizonte [Cop] - 3:15
 Siglos de Amor [Centuries of love] - 4:45
 Señor Disc-Jockey [Mister Disc Kockey] - 3:57
 Igual Que Ayer (Reprise) Bonus Track - 0:17
 Era Un Ángel (Sin Piano) Bonus Track - 3:33

(C) MCMXCII. EMI Music Argentina S.A.

References 

1992 albums
Enanitos Verdes albums